Risser is a surname. Notable people with this surname include:

 Eve Risser (born 1982), French jazz musician
 Fred Risser (born 1927), American politician
 Fred Risser (Progressive politician) (1900–1971), American politician
 James C. Risser (born 1946), American philosopher
 James V. Risser (born 1938), American journalist
 Makana Risser Chai, American author
 Oliver Risser (born 1980), Namibian football player
 Paul G. Risser (1939–2014), American ecologist
 René Risser (1869–1958), French mathematician
 Wilko Risser (born 1982), Namibian-German football player

See also
 Risser sign